Jeff Hassler (born 21 August 1991) is a Canadian rugby union player. He plays at wing and occasionally at the centre position for the Seattle Seawolves in Major League Rugby (MLR), and Rugby Canada's National 15s. He has 36 caps for the National squad in all contests, and former member of the Swansea, Ospreys.

Hassler is an Alberta native having attended Holy Trinity Academy in the southern foothill town of Okotoks. As a youth he excelled at all sports but in particular Canadian football and Rugby.

In his rookie year as an Osprey, he appeared in seventeen matches and notched 8 tries earning him a spot on the RaboDirect Dream Team. In addition, Hassler was voted by fans and peers as Team Canada's 15's player of the year for the 2014 season. Although injury sidelined him for the majority of the 14/15 campaign, Hassler scored 6 tries in eleven appearances with the Ospreys in what was a frustrating campaign in all Guinness Pro14 (formerly Pro12) and European Cup Competitions. On 10 May 2019, it was announced that Hassler signed with the Seattle Seawolves of Major League Rugby.

Early career
Hassler played both Canadian Football and Rugby as a youth where he developed a propensity for a powerful and dynamic running style having excelled at running back in Pee Wee, Bantam, Midget and High School Football.  Hassler's aggressive play caught the attention of multiple CIS (Canadian Interuniversity Sport) programs and after deliberation he would go on to commit to the University of Saskatchewan Huskies Men's football program.

During his stint as a Huskey, he was selected to represent Team World in the 2010 IFAF International Federation of American Football game vs the USA.

Huskies Individual Career Statistics

Professional Rugby Career & Statistics

National Team Senior Men's XV's Statistics

Hassler has represented Canada internationally at the U17, U20 and Senior Men's XV's level and also the on the HSBC Sevens World Series.  He made his debut on the Sevens circuit in Feb 2012 and later that summer with the Senior Men's XV's vs the USA.  At the end of the autumn internationals in 2014, Hassler suffered a serious knee injury that sidelined him for the majority of the remaining season.  He has since gone on to represent Canada in two Rugby World Cups.

Hassler signed with the Ospreys in 2013, and extended his stay with a three-year deal that would see him as a member of the club until the end of the 2017 campaign. He had started the 2014/15 year with a bang, co-leading the team in tries through seven games before injuring his knee in an international friendly. He returned to play on 8 May 2015 versus the Glasgow Warriors. Despite having multiple season ending injuries during his time with the Ospreys Hassler's tough style of play never wavered to the delight of his fans.

References

External links
Player Profile

1991 births
Living people
Canada international rugby union players
Canadian expatriate rugby union players
Canadian expatriate sportspeople in the United States
Expatriate rugby union players in the United States
Prairie Wolf Pack players
Rugby union centres
Saskatchewan Huskies football players
Sportspeople from Calgary
Seattle Seawolves players
Ospreys (rugby union) players
Austin Gilgronis players